Yalta Club (Bulgarian: Ялта) is a nightclub in Sofia, Bulgaria.

It was ranked among the Top 100 Clubs by DJ Mag in its annual rankings in 2009 and 2010. Yalta is located next to Sofia University in the downtown area of the city. In 2011 Yalta club was ranked 19th place and a year later the club reached 12th place.

Notable DJ guests and residents
Since its reorganization into an electronic music club in 1989, Yalta has been a host to a number of popular DJs including Victor Calderone, Timo Maas, Roger Sanchez, Hernan Cattaneo, Laurent Garnier, Danny Tenaglia, Sander Kleinenberg, Axwell, Eric Prydz, Martin Solveig, Markus Schulz and Paul Oakenfold. In addition, Yalta has helped many Bulgarian musicians and DJs to launch their careers.

Other
The Yalta crew is also responsible for the Solar Summer Festival, which takes place every summer at Cacao Beach/Sunny Beach and has previously featured, among others, Tiësto, Dubfire, Fedde Le Grand and Armin Van Buuren. In addition since the opening of sports hall Armeets Arena Yalta holds Christmas and Easter parties in the venue, and helped organize the first A State Of Trance event - ASOT600.

References

External links
Yalta Club Official Website 
Yalta Club At DJ Mag Website
The Ultimate Japan Nightlife Directory

Nightclubs in Europe
Music venues in Bulgaria
Music venues completed in 1959
Buildings and structures in Sofia
Culture in Sofia